Nykara was an ancient Egyptian official of the Fifth Dynasty. His highest positions were that of an overseer of the double granaries and overseer of the granary of the residence. He was also priest at the sun-temple of king Niuserre. Nykara is known from a number of monuments all coming from his tomb at Saqqara. Its exact position is unknown.

A painted limestone statue of Nykara and his family at the Brooklyn Museum (acc. no. 49.215) features him seated and clenching his right fist.

References

Bibliography

See "The Old Kingdom and First Intermediate Period," 408 KB pdf-file, Cleveland Museum of Art, pp. 52–53.
See also Statue of Nykara and his family and Audio Tours: Statue of Nykara and his family, Brooklyn Museum.

Ancient Egyptian officials
People of the Fifth Dynasty of Egypt
Ancient Egyptian overseers of the granaries